Manly Oval is a sporting ground located in Manly, New South Wales, Australia, primarily used for cricket and rugby union. The ground serves as the home ground for the Manly Marlins and Manly Warringah District Cricket Club. Manly Oval has also previously been used to host National Rugby Championship games as a home ground for the Sydney Rays. The ground primarily hosts Shute Shield and Sydney Grade Cricket matches.

References

Cricket grounds in New South Wales
Sports venues in Sydney
Rugby union stadiums in Australia
Manly, New South Wales